Kyōhei, Kyohei or Kyouhei (written: 恭平, 京平, 喬平, 亨平 or 恭兵) is a masculine Japanese given name. Notable people with the name include:
Kyohei Inukai (born 1886) (1886–1954), American artist
, Japanese photographer
Kyohei Inukai (born 1913) (1913–1985), American artist
, Japanese artist
, Japanese composer and record producer
, Japanese actor
, Japanese professional wrestler
, Japanese director
, Japanese footballer
, Japanese rugby union player
, Japanese baseball player
, Japanese baseball player
, Japanese footballer
, Japanese footballer
, Japanese footballer
, Japanese baseball player
, Japanese footballer
, Japanese footballer
, Japanese classical pianist

Fictional characters
Kyohei Takano, a character in the manga series The Wallflower

Japanese masculine given names